Group G of the 2002 FIFA World Cup took place on 13 June 2002. Mexico won the group, and advanced to the second round, along with Italy. Croatia and Ecuador failed to advance.

Standings

Mexico advanced to play United States (runner-up of Group D) in the round of 16.
Italy advanced to play South Korea (winner of Group D) in the round of 16.

Matches
All times local (UTC+9)

Croatia vs Mexico

Italy vs Ecuador

Italy vs Croatia

Mexico vs Ecuador

Mexico vs Italy

Ecuador vs Croatia

External links
 Results

G
Group
Group
Group
Group